Harold Ray Warren (born September 7, 1960) is an American former professional boxer in the Welterweight division. He is a former NABF Featherweight, WBC International Super Featherweight and WBO NABO Lightweight champion.

Pro career 
Harold destroyed Darryl Pinckney to earn the NABF Featherweight championship.

WBA Super Featherweight Championship 
In November 1993, he lost a twelve-round decision to WBA Super Featherweight Champion Genaro Hernandez.

IBF Super Featherweight Championship 
On October 24, 1998, Warren lost to Robert Garcia and his chance at the IBF Super Featherweight Champion, the bout was at the Miccosukee Resort in Miami, Florida.

References

External links 

Boxers from Texas
Welterweight boxers
1960 births
Living people
American male boxers